Affiliation or affiliate may refer to:

 Affiliate (commerce), a legal form of entity relationship used in Business Law
 Affiliation (family law), a legal form of family relationship
 Affiliate marketing
 Affiliate network or affiliation platform, a website connecting advertisers and affiliates
 Affiliated trade union, in British politics, a trade union that has an affiliation to the British Labour Party
 Network affiliate, a relationship between broadcasting companies
 Need for affiliation, a person's need to feel a sense of involvement and "belonging" within a social group
 Political party affiliation
 Religious affiliation, see List of religions and spiritual traditions
 Social affiliation, see Tend and befriend
 Affiliated school 
 Affiliated operator, in math
 Affiliated institution, similar to a consortium or trade association
 AffiliationQuebec a registered political party in Quebec
 Affiliating university
 Affiliated (album), 2006 rap album by MC Eiht
 "Affiliated", song by Bhad Bhabie from the 2018  mixtape 15

See also
 Affiliate (novel), by Sergei Dovlatov (1987)
 Association (disambiguation)